National Bank of Pakistan (NBP) is a Pakistani government-owned multinational commercial bank which is a subsidiary of State Bank of Pakistan. It is headquartered in Karachi, Pakistan. As of September 2020, it has 1,511 branches across Pakistan with assets of approximately USD 20.2 billion.

The bank provides various commercial and public sector banking services, including the debt-equity market, corporate investment banking, retail and consumer banking, agricultural financing, treasury services. In the year 2020, the bank was designated domestic systemically important bank (D-SIB) by the State Bank of Pakistan.

History
1949 National Bank of Pakistan (NBP) was established under the National Bank of Pakistan Ordinance of 1949 and was government-owned. NBP acted as an agent of the central bank wherever the State Bank did not have its own branch. It also undertook government treasury operations. Its first branches were in jute growing areas in East Pakistan. Offices in Karachi and Lahore followed.
1950 NBP established a branch in Jeddah, Saudi Arabia.
1955 By this time NBP had branches in London and Calcutta.
1957 NBP established a branch in Baghdad, Iraq.
1962 NBP established a branch in Dar es Salaam, Tanganyika.
1964 The Iraqi government nationalized NBP's Baghdad branch.
1965 The Indian government seized the Calcutta branch on the outbreak of hostilities between India and Pakistan.
1967 The Tanzanian government nationalized the Dar es Salaam branch.
1971 NBP acquired Bank of China's two branches, one in Karachi and one at Chittagong. At separation of East Pakistan NBP lost its branches there. NBP merged with Eastern Mercantile Bank and with Eastern Bank Corporation.
1974 The government of Pakistan nationalized NBP. As part of the concomitant consolidation of the banking sector, NBP acquired Bank of Bahawalpur.
1977 NBP opened an offshore branch in Cairo.
1994 NBP amalgamated Mehran Bank.	
1997 NBP branch in Ashgabat, Turkmenistan commenced operations.
2000 NBP opened a representative office in Almaty, Kazakhstan.
2001 State Bank of Pakistan and Bank of England agree to allow only 2 Pakistani banks to operate in the UK. NBP and United Bank agreed to merge their operations to form Pakistan International Bank, of which NBP would own 45% and United Bank 55%.	
2002 Pakistan International Bank renamed itself United National Bank Limited (UNB). The ownership structure of the UNB remained as before. The only change to the shareholding structure is that UNB had recently been privatized in Pakistan and was now owned 49% by the Government of Pakistan and 51% by a joint foreign consortium of Abu Dhabi.

NBP needed to redefine its role and shed the public sector bank image, for a modern commercial bank. It has offloaded 23.2 percent share in the stock market, and while it has not been completely privatized like the other three public sector banks, partial privatization has taken place. It is now listed on the Karachi Stock Exchange.

2003 NBP opened its branch in Kabul, and the first ATM in Afghanistan was installed there.
2005 NBP closed its offshore branch in Cairo.
2010 NBP opened its branch in Karaganda (Kazakhstan).
2011 NBP opened its representative office in Toronto (Canada).

Operations
A number of initiatives have been taken, in terms of institutional restructuring, changes in the field structure, in policies and procedures, in internal control systems with special emphasis on corporate governance, adoption of Capital Adequacy Standards under Basel III framework, in the upgradation of the IT infrastructure and developing the human resources.

National Bank of Pakistan has built an extensive branch network with 1450 branches in Pakistan and operates in major business centre abroad. The Bank has representative offices in Beijing, Tashkent, Chicago and Toronto . It has agency arrangements with more than 3000 correspondent banks worldwide.

The Bank saw significant growth between 2000 and 2006. In 2016, total assets were estimated at PKR 1,799 billion, with total deposits being PKR 1,657 billion. Pre-tax profit rose to PKR 37.14 billion. Earnings per share have jumped to PKR 10.69. The increase in profit was achieved through strong growth in core banking income. Gross Interest income increased to PKR 114 billion through growth in the loan portfolio as well as increase in spreads. Gross Advances increased to PKR 781 billion. It ranges from providing credit to the unbanked market segment under NBP Karobar, to small and medium enterprises, to agricultural loans, to large corporate customers.

It has taken various measures to facilitate overseas Pakistanis to send their remittances. In 2002 the Bank signed an agreement with Western Union for expanding the base for documented remittances.

Subsidiaries
The NBP's subsidiaries are Taurus Securities Ltd, NBP Exchange Company Ltd, NBP Leasing Ltd, NBP Modaraba Management Company Ltd, and CJSC Bank, Almaty, Kazakhstan. The Bank's joint ventures is United National Bank (UK). Cast – N- Link Products Ltd.

International offices
National Bank of Pakistan branch in Washington, D.C.
NBP also has branches /offices in the United States, UK, Canada, Germany, France, Bahrain, Egypt, Bangladesh, Hong Kong, Japan, South Korea, The People's Republic of China, Afghanistan, Turkmenistan, Kyrgyz Republic, Kazakhstan, Uzbekistan, Azerbaijan and Saudi Arabia.

NBP Fund Management Limited 
NBP Funds is a Non-Banking Finance Company jointly owned by National Bank of Pakistan and Fullerton Fund Management Group, Singapore, which in-turn is a wholly owned subsidiary of Temasek Holdings, Singapore.

Sports 
 Cricket
NBP owns a team since 1947 and a venue since 1998, both named after it and both located in Karachi. In October 2022, NBP got the naming rights of National Stadium Karachi.

 Football
NBP owns a Karachi-based men's team playing in Pakistan Premier League.
NBP is not involved with any women's team in Pakistan, nevertheless, in October 2020, its director, Imam Baloch, publicly lauded Diya W.F.C.'s actions for spreading football to poor and "backward areas" of Karachi and Sindh.

 Hockey
NBP owns a team which won the National Hocky Championship in 2013.

See also

 State Bank of Pakistan
 Zarai Taraqiati Bank Ltd.

References

External links
National Bank of Pakistan (NBP)

State Bank of Pakistan
Pakistani companies established in 1949
Banks established in 1949
Banks of Pakistan
Companies based in Karachi
Companies listed on the Pakistan Stock Exchange
Government-owned banks of Pakistan
Multinational companies headquartered in Pakistan